Massimo Drago (born March 2, 1971) is an Italian professional football coach and a former player.

Playing career
Born in Crotone, Drago started his career at hometown club Kroton in the Serie C2 league. In 1990–91 he had a short stint at Serie B level with Avellino, in what was his highest point as a footballer. He successively played at Serie C1, Serie C2 and Serie D level with a variety of teams before retiring in 2004.

Coaching career
After retiring as a player, Drago joined Crotone's coaching staff in 2005 as a youth coach for the Giovanissimi (under-15) level. In 2008, he was promoted as technical collaborator for the first team, and was successively named as assistant coach to Leonardo Menichini in 2011. After the latter's dismissal as head coach, Drago was then promoted new head coach of Crotone in January 2012, successfully guiding the Calabrian club to safety in  the 2011–12 Serie B and being successively appointed as permanent manager by the end of the season.

Drago was successively admitted to the UEFA Pro Licence course due to his role as manager of a Serie B club in December 2012. Under his tenure, Crotone achieved a twelfth place in the 2012–13 season and, then, an impressive sixth place in the 2013–14 Serie B, the best result in the club history to date, thus qualifying to the promotion playoffs (then lost to Bari).

On 4 February 2019, Drago was appointed as the manager of Reggina. The adventure at Reggina ended after only 9 games. He was fired after a defeat to Sicula Leonzio on 4 April 2019, after only managing to get 9 points in 9 games.

References

1971 births
Living people
People from Crotone
Italian footballers
Serie B players
F.C. Crotone players
Catania S.S.D. players
U.S. Avellino 1912 players
Potenza S.C. players
Italian football managers
F.C. Crotone managers
Association football defenders
U.S. Castrovillari Calcio players
Footballers from Calabria
Sportspeople from the Province of Crotone